The Duncan station in Duncan, British Columbia was a stop on Via Rail's Dayliner service, which has been indefinitely suspended since 2011. It is located on the Southern Railway of Vancouver Island mainline.

History 
The station building was built in 1912 by the Esquimalt and Nanaimo Railway. "Duncan's Crossing Station" was established at Duncan's Crossing, named after William Chalmers Duncan, who farmed in the region. On March 4, 1912 the City of Duncan was incorporated.

The station was designated a Heritage Railway Stations in 1993.

Closing 
Duncan Station closed on March 19, 2011, when Via Rail suspended service indefinitely due to poor track conditions and was replaced with a bus service operated by Via Rail. On August 12, 2011, the bus service ended with station closing.

The station is now used as the site of the Cowichan Valley Museum.

See also
 List of designated heritage railway stations of Canada

References

Via Rail stations in British Columbia
Designated Heritage Railway Stations in British Columbia
Railway stations in Canada opened in 1886
Railway stations closed in 2011
Duncan, British Columbia
1886 establishments in British Columbia
2011 disestablishments in British Columbia
Disused railway stations in Canada